Cameron McEvoy (born 13 May 1994) is an Australian competitive swimmer who represented his country at the 2012 Summer Olympics, 2016 Summer Olympics and 2020 Summer Olympics.

Career

Junior
At the 2011 World Junior Championships in Lima, Peru, McEvoy won gold medals in the 50 m and 100 m freestyle, and a bronze in the 200 m freestyle.

Senior
McEvoy swam in the heats of the 4 × 100 m freestyle and 4 × 200 m freestyle relays at the 2012 Olympics in London. Australia went on to finish in fourth and fifth place, respectively.
At the 2013 and 2015 World Aquatics Championships he has won a total of four medals, including the silver medal in the 100-metre freestyle in 2015.

At the 2014 Commonwealth Games, he won six medals. A month later at the 2014 Pan Pacific Championships, he won five medals including the gold medal in the 100-metre freestyle. He also won national titles in the 100- and 200-metre freestyle in 2014 and 2015.

At the 2016 National Championships and Olympic trials, McEvoy qualified for the Olympics in the 200-metre freestyle, by finishing first, tied with Thomas Fraser-Holmes. He also qualified in the 100-metre freestyle by winning the race. His time of 47.04 broke the Australian and Commonwealth records and was the fastest time ever in a textile swimsuit, until Caeleb Dressel's performance at the 2019 World Championships. He qualified for a third individual event when he won the 50-metre freestyle in a new personal best of 21.44. In addition, McEvoy also qualified for the Olympic team in the 4x100m, 4x200m freestyle relays & 4x100m medley relay.  Leading up to the games, he dropped the 200m freestyle to focus on being his freshest for the relays.

Personal life
McEvoy is a physics and mathematics student at Griffith University. At the 2016 Olympic trials he gained attention by wearing a swim cap with the signal of two merging black holes to celebrate the first observation of gravitational waves that had been announced two months earlier. The year before he wore a cap showing a Feynman diagram of a positron and an electron annihilating.

McEvoy is the grandson of Barney McEvoy who played rugby league for New South Wales in 1960 and who played club rugby league for the North Sydney and Manly Warringah clubs.

In May 2021, McEvoy offered his house for A$1.5 million or the equivalent in bitcoin. It's unclear if the house was sold.

Career best times

See also
 List of World Aquatics Championships medalists in swimming (men)
 List of Commonwealth Games medallists in swimming (men)

References

External links
  (archive 2)
 
 
 
 
 
 
 

1994 births
Living people
Australian male freestyle swimmers
Olympic swimmers of Australia
Olympic bronze medalists for Australia
Olympic bronze medalists in swimming
Swimmers at the 2012 Summer Olympics
Swimmers at the 2016 Summer Olympics
Swimmers at the 2020 Summer Olympics
Medalists at the 2016 Summer Olympics
Medalists at the 2020 Summer Olympics
Commonwealth Games medallists in swimming
Commonwealth Games gold medallists for Australia
Commonwealth Games silver medallists for Australia
Swimmers at the 2014 Commonwealth Games
World Aquatics Championships medalists in swimming
Sportspeople from the Gold Coast, Queensland
20th-century Australian people
21st-century Australian people
Griffith University alumni
Medallists at the 2014 Commonwealth Games